Billy Jones in an American college baseball coach. He had served as head coach of the Appalachian State Mountaineers baseball program from 2013 to 2016. He was named to that position prior to the 2013 season.

Jones played at Lower Columbia College and Bellevue Community College before spending his final season at Division I Southwest Texas State.  He began coaching as an assistant for two seasons at Green River Community College being elevated to the head coaching position.  After two more seasons, he moved to Oregon State as an assistant, where he worked with infielders for two years.  Jones then spent a year in the same position at Arizona State.  Following the 2001 season, he coached the Brewster Whitecaps of the Cape Cod League. In 2002, he moved to NC State, where he worked for three seasons.  He started as an assistant coach, and later added recruiting coordinator duties.  In 2005, Jones accepted the same position at Oklahoma State.  On July 6, 2013, Jones was introduced as head coach at Appalachian State, his first Division I head coaching position.

Head coaching record
The table below lists Jones' record as a head coach at the Division I level.

References

Living people
Sportspeople from Kent, Washington
Arizona State Sun Devils baseball coaches
Bellevue Bulldogs baseball players
Cape Cod Baseball League coaches
Green River Gators baseball coaches
Lower Columbia Red Devils baseball players
NC State Wolfpack baseball coaches
Oklahoma State Cowboys baseball coaches
Oregon State Beavers baseball coaches
Texas State Bobcats baseball players
Baseball players from Washington (state)
Appalachian State Mountaineers baseball coaches
Tulane Green Wave baseball coaches
Year of birth missing (living people)